Murroe / Boher GAA is a Gaelic Athletic Association club based in County Limerick, Ireland. It is based in the parish of Murroe / Boher in the east division of Limerick GAA.

History
The club was founded in 1887, which makes it one of the oldest clubs in county Limerick.

Notable hurlers
 Sean O'Neill
 Owen O'Neill
 Séamus Hickey
 Joe Quaid
 Kevin Tobin
 Pat Tobin
 Sean Tobin

Honours
 Limerick Senior Hurling Championship : 1887
 Limerick Senior B Hurling Championship : 2003
 Limerick Premier Intermediate Hurling Championship : 2017
 Limerick Intermediate Hurling Championship : 1914, 1999
 Limerick Junior Hurling Championship : 1917, 1973, 1980, 1987
 Limerick Junior B Hurling Championship : 2016
 Limerick Under-21 "A" Hurling Championship : 1997, 2015
 Limerick Minor "A" Hurling Championship : 2014
 East Limerick Senior Hurling Championship: 1982, 1983, 2005, 2008, 2009, 2010

External links
 Murroe/Boher GAA website

Gaelic games clubs in County Limerick
Hurling clubs in County Limerick